Have You Got Any Castles is a 1938 Warner Bros. Merrie Melodies cartoon directed by Frank Tashlin. The short was released on June 25, 1938.   Characters from well-known works of literary fiction come to life inside of a library that was just closed to the public (outside of the library) by the owner.

Plot
When the cartoon opens, the cuckoo clock in the library sounds, and the camera pans over the room, to the Town Crier (a caricature of Alexander Woolcott, who did a radio show of that name) who gives a brief introduction. After this, we meet four monsters (Mr. Hyde, Fu Manchu, the Phantom of the Opera, and Frankenstein's monster) who introduce themselves roaring, but then dance briefly to Gossec's "Gavotte." As characters from other books cheer that performance, the protagonist of The Good Earth, his head the shape of a globe, says prayers by his bedside. The camera pans the library to the right, revealing the book The Invisible Man and an invisible man dancing, who hands off to Topper (a novel from a series by Thorne Smith, as well as a contemporary film) where a similar character continues a similar dance, then moves to The Thirty-Nine Steps where a caricature of "Bojangles" Robinson dances down the steps, So Big with a caricature of Greta Garbo, and The Green Pastures which turns out to feature a big band presentation of "Swing for Sale" led by a caricature of Cab Calloway. That clip was from the Friz Freleng short Clean Pastures.

Panning left over the cheering crowd, the camera reveals a singing Heidi on the cover of her eponymous book, a literal Thin Man when viewed from the side (a caricature of William Powell as Nick Charles) walking into the White House Cook Book and, when walking back out and seen from the side, shows that he has packed on some weight in his posterior. Whistler's Mother, on the cover of the book, Great Works of Art whistles "Ain't She Sweet", then three Little Women (three Jane Withers clones) and three Little Men (three Freddie Bartholomew clones) sing with Old King Cole (spoofing deep-voiced Warner Bros. character actor Eugene Pallette), the characters of The House of the Seven Gables (seven identical caricatures of Clark Gable), and a drumming bulldog intended to parody Bulldog Drummond. Next Louis Pasteur (a caricature of Paul Muni in his Oscar-winning role) mixes chemicals from test tubes until they blow up, after which Pasteur is in Seventh Heaven. Also appearing is Captain William Bligh from Mutiny on the Bounty (a caricature of Charles Laughton's portrayal of him). None of this pleases a sleeping Rip Van Winkle (Ned Sparks, a well-known Hollywood "grouch"); the hermit complains, "Old King Cole is a noisy old soul", while using the Valiant Little Tailor's scissors to snip hair from the title character of Uncle Tom's Cabin to plug his ears.

The music gets louder, as The Three Musketeers (The Ritz Brothers) sing the title song of the cartoon, with Drums Along the Mohawk providing a beat, Emily Post (here portrayed as "Emily Host") scolds Henry VIII of England for his rudeness, and a character from Katherine Mayo's controversial 1927 book Mother India plays along on his pungi.  Then Rip again takes scissors from the Tailor and tries to use them once more on Uncle Tom; Tom beats him back then uses the scissors to cut Rip's beard.   Then Diamond Jim Brady (an Edward Arnold caricature, from the 1935 film of the same name) comes along pitching mortgage payments as the Drums beat louder, Henry becomes even more gluttonous (and Emily Post joins in the gluttony), and Oliver Twist twists.  W. C. Fields (here portrayed with a red nose in a parody of So Red the Rose) joins in, as does the Pied Piper of Hamelin, piping a jazzy tune and being followed by a herd of jazzy mice.

The Musketeers become Three Men on a Horse and, along the way grab the Seven Keys to Baldpate which they use to free the Prisoner of Zenda, over Aladdin's objections. Aladdin gets punched out by one of the Men.  As the Three Men pass The Informer (a caricature of Victor McLaglen, who won a 1935 Academy Award for playing the role), he whispers to Little Boy Blue (here named "Little Boy Blew") who then trumpets for a Charge of the Light Brigade.  Robinson Crusoe fires at the Three Men, along with guns from All Quiet on the Western Front and backup cavalry from Under Two Flags. With the incessant noise, Rip has had enough of trying to sleep; he loses his temper and, as the battling, running characters approach, he opens The Hurricane, so that all of them end up Gone with the Wind (in a play on the then-recent book), blown back to their own books.

After this, the Town Crier appears again, concluding the cartoon with a brief message ending with "All is well, all is well ...", and the camera pans back to the cuckoo clock where Rip, who has apparently muzzled the cuckoo, is finally sound asleep.

Cast and Crew

Voice Cast 
Mel Blanc as Town Crier, Praying Baby, Rip Van Winkle, Emily Host, Aladdin
Tedd Pierce as W. C. Fields
Georgia Stark as Whistler's Mother, Heidi
Delos Jewkes as Old King Cole
The Four Blackbirds as Singing Group ("Swing for Sale")
The Basin Street Boys as Singing Group ("Swing for Sale")
The Three Dots of Rhythm as Singing Group ("You're the Cure for What Ails Me")

Crew
 New Footage Directed by Frank Tashlin
 Archive Footage Directed by Friz Freleng (uncredited)
 Film Produced by Leon Schlesinger
 Film Edited by Treg Brown (uncredited)
 Story by Jack Miller
 Musical Direction by Carl W. Stalling
 Orchestration by Milt Franklyn (uncredited)
 Animation by Ken Harris
 Uncredited Animation by Volney White, Robert McKimson
 Archive Animation by Phil Monroe (uncredited) & Paul J. Smith (uncredited)
 Visual Backgrounds Supervised by Art Loomer (uncredited)

Home media
 LaserDisc – The Golden Age of Looney Tunes, Volume 1, Side 1
 DVD – Looney Tunes Golden Collection: Volume 2 (with the Alexander Woolcott scenes restored)

Notes
The musical performance of the big band song "Swing for Sale" by The Four Blackbirds and The Basin Street Boys is taken directly from the 1937 cartoon short Clean Pastures, directed by Friz Freleng. 
This cartoon was re-released into the Blue Ribbon Merrie Melodies program on February 1, 1947.
The cartoon entered the public domain in 1966 when its last rights holder, United Artists (successor-in-interest to Associated Artists Productions), failed to renew the original copyright within the required 28-year period.
The "Town crier" in this short is a caricature of Alexander Woollcott, in reference to his CBS Radio program of the same name. He has similar mannerisms to the owl caricature of Woollcott in another Tashlin short, The Woods Are Full of Cuckoos, which was released the year before. When the cartoon was re-released, Woollcott asked that his scenes be excised from the film when he died, deducting about a minute from the film. Eventually, these scenes were restored to the Looney Tunes Golden Collection: Volume 2 DVD set. This version retains the Blue Ribbon opening and closing titles.
After the cuckoo clock sounds and the camera pans over the library, the shadow of the Town Crier appears, and afterwards, instead of hearing him ringing his bell and shouting "Hear ye, hear ye! ...", we see a fade-out to the books being presented.
The cartoon fades to black after Rip van Winkle eliminates everyone into The Hurricane and Gone with the Wind pops up. As a result of this, the brief scene where the cuckoo bird's mouth is covered and van Winkle sleeping on the clock is also cut.
The original song is from the 1937 film Varsity Show, with music by Richard A. Whiting and lyrics by Johnny Mercer.
The daily publication The Film Daily called the short a "fine fantasy", and gave it the following review:
The story takes place in a library, with all the characters coming to life from well known works of fiction, both classical and modern. Rip Van Winkle is the center of interest, as he cannot continue sleeping with the noise. Finally he gets The Hurricane to blow all the noise-makers back into the covers of their books again, and he goes peacefully to sleep. The final titles show the pop book Gone with the Wind. Produced by Leon Schlesinger. Story by Jack Miller. Animation by Ken Harris. In Technicolor.

See also
 A Coy Decoy
 Book Revue (film)

References

External links
 
 
 Watch Have You Got Any Castles? uncut, closed-captioned, in high definition, and complete with the Woollcott caricature appearances, on YouTube.
 Have You Got Any Castles? on the Internet Archive''
 : An unedited version of the cartoon with revisions intact

1938 films
1938 animated films
1938 short films
Merrie Melodies short films
Short films directed by Frank Tashlin
American musical comedy films
1930s color films
1930s Warner Bros. animated short films
1938 musical comedy films
Films about books
Films produced by Leon Schlesinger
Films scored by Carl Stalling
Films set in libraries
Animated crossover films
Cultural depictions of Cab Calloway
Cultural depictions of Greta Garbo
Cultural depictions of Henry VIII
Cultural depictions of W. C. Fields
1940s English-language films
1930s English-language films